The 2009–2010 session was a meeting of the California State Legislature.

Dates of sessions
Convene: December 1, 2008
Adjourn: November 30, 2010

Major events

Vacancies and special elections
November 30, 2008: Senator Mark Ridley-Thomas (D-26) resigns to take a seat on the Los Angeles County Board of Supervisors
May 19, 2009: Assemblyman Curren Price (D-51) wins the special election for the 26th Senate District seat to replace Ridley-Thomas and is sworn in on June 8
September 1, 2009: Councilman Steven Bradford (D-Gardena) wins the special election for the 51st Assembly District seat to replace Price and is sworn in on September 10
September 9, 2009: Assemblyman Michael D. Duvall (R-72) resigns in the wake of a lobbyist sex scandal
November 5, 2009: Lieutenant Governor (and Senate President) John Garamendi resigns to take a seat in the United States House of Representatives
November 30, 2009: Senator John J. Benoit (R-37) resigns to take a seat on the Riverside County Board of Supervisors
January 5, 2010: Assemblyman Paul Krekorian (D-43) resigns to take a seat on the Los Angeles City Council
January 12, 2010: Supervisor Chris Norby (R-Fullerton) wins the special election for the 72nd Assembly District seat to replace Duvall and is sworn in on January 29
April 27, 2010: Senator Abel Maldonado (R-15) resigns his Senate seat to become Lieutenant Governor to replace Garamendi
June 8, 2010: Assemblyman Bill Emmerson (R-63) wins the special election for the 37th Senate District seat to replace Benoit and is sworn in on June 9
June 8, 2010: Attorney Mike Gatto (D-Silver Lake) wins the special election for the 43rd Assembly District seat to replace Krekorian and is sworn in on June 10
July 13, 2010: Senator Dave Cox (R-1) dies from prostate cancer
August 17, 2010: Assemblyman Sam Blakeslee (R-33) wins the special election for the 15th Senate District seat to replace Maldonado and is sworn in on August 23
October 20, 2010: Senator Jenny Oropeza (D-28) dies of complications from a blood clot

Leadership changes
February 18, 2009: Senator Dennis Hollingsworth (R-36) replaces Senator Dave Cogdill (R-14) as Senate Republican Leader
June 1, 2009: Assemblyman Sam Blakeslee (R-33) replaces Assemblyman Mike Villines (R-29) as Assembly Republican Leader
February 1, 2010: Assemblyman Martin Garrick (R-74) replaces Assemblyman Sam Blakeslee (R-33) as Assembly Republican Leader, as Blakeslee is termed out at the end of the term
March 1, 2010: Assemblyman John Pérez (D-46) replaces Assemblywoman Karen Bass (D-47) as Speaker of the Assembly, as Bass is termed out at the end of the term
October 11, 2010: Senator Bob Dutton (R-31) replaces Senator Dennis Hollingsworth (R-36) as Senate Republican Leader, as Hollingsworth is termed out at the end of the term

Party changes
June 22, 2009: Assemblyman Juan Arambula (D-31) leaves the Democratic Party to become an independent

Members
Skip to Assembly, below

Senate

  Democrats: 24
  Republicans: 14
  Vacancies: 2

Officers
President Pro Tem: Darrell Steinberg (D-Sacramento)
Majority Leader: Dean Florez (D-Shafter)
Minority Leader: Bob Dutton (R-Rancho Cucamonga) from October 11, 2010
Dennis Hollingsworth (R-Murrieta) from February 18, 2009, to October 11, 2010
Dave Cogdill (R-Modesto) to February 18, 2009
Secretary: Greg Schmidt
Sergeant at Arms: Tony Beard, Jr.
Note: The Secretary and the Sergeant at Arms are not Members of the Legislature

Full list of members, 2009–2010

Assembly

  Democrats: 50
  Republicans: 27
  Independent: 1
  Vacancies: 2

Officers
Speaker: John Pérez (D-Los Angeles) from March 1, 2010
Karen Bass (D-Los Angeles) to March 1, 2010
Speaker pro Tempore: Fiona Ma (D-San Francisco) from March 18, 2010
Lori Saldaña (D-San Diego) to March 18, 2010
Assistant Speaker Pro Tempore: Isadore Hall, III (D-Compton)
Majority Floor Leader: Charles Calderon (D-Montebello) from March 18, 2010
Alberto Torrico (D-Newark) to March 18, 2010
Minority Floor Leader: Martin Garrick (R-Carlsbad) from February 1, 2010
Sam Blakeslee (R-San Luis Obispo) from June 1, 2009, to February 1, 2010
Michael Villines (R-Clovis) to June 1, 2009
Chief Clerk: E. Dotson Wilson
Sergeant at Arms: Ronald Pane
Note: The Chief Clerk and the Sergeant at Arms are not Members of the Legislature

Full List of Members, 2009–2010

See also
 List of California state legislatures

References 

2009-2010
2009 in California
2010 in California
2009 U.S. legislative sessions
2010 U.S. legislative sessions